Roseburg is the name of two places in the State of Indiana in the United States of America:

Roseburg, Grant County, Indiana
Roseburg, Union County, Indiana